Volkswagen Group have produced a number of W12 internal combustion piston engines for their Volkswagen, Audi, and Bentley marques, since 2001.

Overview
The only mass-production W12 engine is the Volkswagen 6.0 WR12 48v, a four-bank design which was released in 2001. This engine has been used in several models from the brands Audi, Bentley, and Volkswagen, and in 2003 a turbocharged version was released.

The engine is constructed by mating two narrow-angle 15° VR6 engines at an inclined angle of 72°. The narrow angle of each set of cylinders allows just two overhead camshafts to drive each pair of banks, so the W12 engine has the same number of camshafts as a V12 engine. The W12 engine has a very compact design for a 12-cylinder engine, with the overall size of the  engine being smaller than Volkswagen's contemporary  V8 engine.

The first production car to use the W12 engine was the 2001 Audi A8 (D2). Other cars to use the W12 engine are the 2003–present Bentley Continental GT, 2005-present Bentley Continental Flying Spur, 2015–present Bentley Bentayga, 2004-2011 Volkswagen Phaeton W12 and the 2005-2010 Volkswagen Touareg W12. The engine was also used in the 2006 Spyker C12 La Turbie and 2008 Spyker C12 Zagato low-volume sports cars.

Variants

6.0 WR12 48v

This W12 badged W12 engine is twelve cylinder W engine of two rows of (staggered) 6 cylinders, formed by joining two imaginary 15° VR6 engine cylinder blocks, placed on a single crankshaft, with each cylinder 'double-bank' now at a 72° angle. This specific configuration is more appropriately described as a WR12 engine.

This Volkswagen Group engine is also used with slight modification, and with the addition of two turbochargers in the Bentley Continental GT, Bentley Continental Flying Spur and Bentley Bentayga.
identification parts code prefix: 07C
engine displacement & engine configuration  72° W12 engine; bore x stroke: , stroke ratio: 0.93:1 – undersquare/long-stroke, 499.9 cc per cylinder, compression ratio: 10.7:1
cylinder block & crankcase homogeneous monoblock low-pressure chill die cast hypereutectic 'Alusil' aluminium-silicon alloy (AlSi17Cu4Mg); torsionally stiff aluminium alloy crankcase with high-resistance cylinder liners, simplex roller chain driven oil pump; die-forged steel 21.2 kg crankshaft, seven main bearings, crankpins offset to achieve a constant firing order as on a V6 engine
cylinder heads & valvetrain cast aluminium alloy; four valves per cylinder, 48 valves total, low-friction roller finger cam followers with automatic hydraulic valve clearance compensation, double overhead camshaft driven from the flywheel side via a two-stage chain drive utilising three 3/8" simplex roller chains, continuous vane-adjustable variable valve timing for intake and exhaust camshafts with up to 52 degrees timing range for the flow-optimised inlet ports, 22 degrees on the exhaust camshafts
aspiration two air filters, two hot-film air mass meters, two throttle bodies each with electronically controlled Bosch 'E-Gas' throttle valves, four-part two-channel cast magnesium alloy intake manifold; Bentley versions also use twin-turbos – one turbocharger per VR cylinder bank
fuel system, ignition system, engine management two linked common rail fuel distributor rails, multi-point electronic sequential indirect fuel injection with twelve intake manifold-sited fuel injectors; centrally positioned NGK longlife spark plugs, mapped direct ignition with 12 individual direct-acting single spark coils; Bosch Motronic ME 7.1.1 electronic engine control unit (ECU), cylinder-selective knock control via four knock sensors, permanent lambda control, water-cooled alternator
exhaust system two vacuum-controlled secondary air injection pumps for direct injection into exhaust ports to assist cold start operation, four exhaust manifolds with four integrated ceramic catalytic converters, eight heated oxygen sensors monitoring pre- and post catalyst exhaust gases
dimensions length: , height: , width:  then 
DIN-rated motive power & torque outputs – Audi / Volkswagen, ID codes
;  — Audi A8: AZC (01/01-09/02), VW Phaeton: BAN (04/02-05/05)
 at 6,200 rpm,  at 4,000 rpm,  at 2,300–5,300 rpm — Audi A8: BHT, BSB, BTE (12/03-07/10)
 at 6,000 rpm;  at 2,750–5,000 rpm — Phaeton: BRN, BTT (05/05-03/16)
 at 6,000 rpm;  at 3,300 rpm — Touareg: BJN, CFRA (08/04-05/10)
DIN-rated motive power & torque outputs – Bentley twin turbo
 at 6,100 rpm;  at 1,600–6,100 rpm — standard models: BWR, BEB, MTBHT
 at 6,000 rpm;  at 1,700–5,600 rpm — "Speed" models: CKHC, BWRA 
 at 5,900 rpm;  at 2,050–4,500 rpm — "Supersports" model
applications Audi A8 (AZC: 03/01-09/02, BHT: 02/04-, BSB: 10/04-, BTE: 02/05-), Volkswagen Phaeton (BAN: 05/02-05/05, BRN: 05/05-10/08, BTT: 05/05-10/08), Volkswagen Touareg sport (BJN: 08/04-, CFRA: 02/08-), Bentley Continental GT, Bentley Continental Flying Spur

6.0 WR12 48v TFSI
It would mostly share the same technical specifications with its turbocharged 6.0-liter predecessor, other than the fact that it was modified to meet new WLTP emission standards. This new engine was promised to be made available on the fourth generation A8, following S8 and 60 TFSI/TDI models. However, as of August 2020, only examples of the W12 variant were press cars. It is rumoured that the W12 variant is only available as special orders in selected European dealerships.

6.3 WR12 48v FSI (CEJA)
This new engine was promised to be made available on the 3rd generation A8 More compact dimensions than a comparable V8 engine FSI direct injection with twin high-pressure fuel pumps, twin fuel rails, and six-port high-pressure injectors.
applications
A8 L W12 6.3 FSI quattro (CEJA)

Applications
Volkswagen W12
Audi A8
Bentley Continental GT
Bentley Flying Spur
Bentley Bentayga
Volkswagen Touareg W12
Spyker C12 La Turbie
Spyker C12 Zagato

References

references
reference

W engines
Volkswagen Group
Audi engines
Bentley engines
Volkswagen Group engines
Gasoline engines by model
Engines by model
Piston engines
Internal combustion engine